Dolf Verroen (born 20 November 1928) is a Dutch writer of children's literature.

Career 

Early in his career, he worked for the newspaper Het Vrije Volk. Verroen made his debut in 1955 with the poetry collection In los verband. His first children's book Het boek van Jan-Kees, later republished as Paarden, van die enge grote, was published in 1958 although he wrote the story originally between age 14 and 15.

He won the Zilveren Griffel award four times: in 1979 for De kat in de gordijnen, in 1981 for Hoe weet jij dat nou?, in 1987 for Een leeuw met lange tanden and in 2019 for Droomopa.

In 2006, he won the Deutscher Jugendliteraturpreis for his book Wie schön weiß ich bin, a German translation of Slaaf Kindje Slaaf by Rolf Erdorf. The book was later republished under the title Hoe mooi wit ik ben with illustrations by Martijn van der Linden. The book is inspired by his journey to Suriname with Miep Diekmann in 1976.

In 1999, he became Ridder in the Order of the Netherlands Lion.

In 2016, Verroen published Oorlog en vriendschap, the Kinderboekenweekgeschenk, a publication on the occasion of the annual Boekenweek (Dutch Book Week).

Verroen's books have been illustrated by various illustrators, including Jet Boeke, Thé Tjong-Khing and Harrie Geelen.

Awards 

 1979: Zilveren Griffel, De kat in de gordijnen
 1981: Zilveren Griffel, Hoe weet jij dat nou?
 1982: Vlag en Wimpel, Juf is gek (with illustrations by Thé Tjong-Khing)
 1987: Zilveren Griffel, Een leeuw met lange tanden
 1989: Vlag en Wimpel, De liefste poes van de wereld
 2006: Deutscher Jugendliteraturpreis, Wie schön weiß ich bin (translated by Rolf Erdorf)
 2019: Zilveren Griffel, Droomopa

References

External links 

 
 Dolf Verroen (in Dutch), Digital Library for Dutch Literature

1928 births
Living people
Dutch children's writers
20th-century Dutch male writers
21st-century Dutch male writers
Recipients of the Order of the Netherlands Lion